Kahan Tum Chalay Gaye (previously titled Meri Har Nazar Teri Muntazir) is a Pakistani drama serial that first aired on Geo Entertainment on 10 February 2016. It is produced by Babar Javed and Asif Raza. It currently airs every Sunday 7pm  only on Geo Entertainment, after being moved from the Wed&Thurs 10pm-11pm slot. The show went off air unfinished after 9-10 episodes (early March) due to military censor issues but then resumed after 2 months, in May 2016, with a name change.

Cast

Saman Ansari
Muhammad Ali
Firdous Jamal
Dania Enwer as Salma
Parveen Akbar as Kausar
Ali Hassan
Farah Nadir as Bilal's mother
Faisal Qazi
Hira Shaikh
Fariya Hassan as Shiza

See also
 Geo TV
 List of Pakistani television series
 List of programs broadcast by Geo Entertainment

External links

A&B Entertainment
2016 Pakistani television series debuts
Geo TV original programming
Pakistani drama television series
2016 Pakistani television series endings
Urdu-language television shows